Robert Bowers may refer to:

 Robert Bruce Bowers (1897–1956), Irish cricket player
 Robert Hood Bowers (1877–1941), American musician
 Barney Bowers (born 1959, as Robert Bowers), British football player
 Robert Gregory Bowers (born 1972), alleged perpetrator of the Pittsburgh synagogue shooting

See also
 Robert Bower (disambiguation)
 Bowers (disambiguation)